Sceloporus consobrinus, the southern prairie lizard, is a species of lizard in the family Phrynosomatidae. It is found in Texas, Oklahoma, New Mexico, Arizona, Kansas, Colorado, and Nebraska in the United States.

References

Sceloporus
Reptiles of the United States
Reptiles described in 1854
Taxa named by Spencer Fullerton Baird
Taxa named by Charles Frédéric Girard